Gabriel is a novel by Lisa Tuttle published in 1987.

Plot summary
Gabriel is a novel in which Dinah is a young widow whose charismatic husband Gabriel has died.

Reception
Dave Langford reviewed Gabriel for White Dwarf #98, and stated that "Tuttle concentrates on small fears, things which (as opposed to the likelihood of putrescent zombies crawling from the toilet) do actually worry people: fear of embarrassment, of losing control, of doing something shamefully out of character."

Reviews
Review by Paul J. McAuley (1987) in Vector 139

References

1987 novels